"Boomerang" is a song by DJ Felli Fel released as his fourth single in March 2011. It features Akon, Pitbull and Jermaine Dupri. The song peaked at number 34 on the Netherlands Singles Chart.

Track listing
Digital download

"Boomerang" (Original Version) (featuring  Akon, Pitbull and Jermaine Dupri) - 3:29
"Boomerang" (Clean Version) (featuring  Akon, Pitbull and Jermaine Dupri) - 3:29
"Boomerang" (Club Version) (featuring  Akon, Pitbull and Jermaine Dupri) - 4:30
"Boomerang" (Instrumental Version) <small> - 3:30

Charts

References 

2011 singles
DJ Felli Fel songs
Akon songs
Pitbull (rapper) songs
Jermaine Dupri songs
Songs written by Akon
So So Def Recordings singles
2011 songs